Berezovka is a rural locality (a village) in Kubenskoye Rural Settlement, Vologodsky District, Vologda Oblast, Russia. The population was 10 as of 2002.

Geography 
Berezovka is located 57 km northwest of Vologda (the district's administrative centre) by road. Petrushino is the nearest rural locality.

References 

Rural localities in Vologodsky District